The list comprises all Carlin race results.

Current series results

FIA Formula 2

In detail

FIA Formula 3

* Season still in progress

In detail
(key) (Races in bold indicate pole position) (Races in italics indicate fastest lap)

Macau Grand Prix

BRDC British Formula 3 Championship / GB3 Championship

* Season still in progress

F4 British Championship

* Season still in progress

†Hedley drove for Fortec Motorsport until round 5. Bolger drove for JHR Developments in round 10.

Formula 4 UAE Championship

Complete former series results

British Formula 3 Championship

[B] Drivers and classification in the B or National class.

[G] Guest drivers, no points awarded.

GP2 Series

† — Includes points scored for ART Grand Prix

In detail 
(key) (Races in bold indicate pole position) (Races in italics indicate fastest lap)

Formula Nissan/Renault 3.5 Series

†Includes points scored with EuroInternational.

FIA Formula E

‡ FanBoost in Formula E.

† These drivers also drove for other teams during the season and their final positions include all team results.

D.C. = Drivers' Championship position, T.C. = Teams' Championship position, NC = Not Classified.

[G] Guest driver

GP3 Series

In detail 
(key) (Races in bold indicate pole position) (Races in italics indicate fastest lap)

A1 Grand Prix Series

Eurocup Formula Renault 2.0

Porsche Supercup

Formula 3 Euro Series

† The 2012 Formula 3 Euro Series was run in partnership with the 2012 European Formula 3 Championship, with eight of the ten European F3 rounds counting towards the F3 Euro Series point tallies.

FIA European Formula 3 Championship

As Carlin

As Jagonya Ayam with Carlin

In 2014 and 2015, Carlin competed with two teams in European F3, under the names of Carlin and Jagonya Ayam with Carlin.

IndyCar Series
(key)

Euroformula Open Championship

†Trulli drove for Drivex School until round 3. Mansell drove for Team Motopark from round 7 onwards.

Indy Lights

In detail

(key)

Japanese Formula 3 Championship

As OIRC team YTB by Carlin

References

GP2 Series teams